Beauce-Nord is a provincial electoral district in the Chaudière-Appalaches region of Quebec, Canada that elects members to the National Assembly of Quebec. It includes notably the municipalities of Sainte-Marie, Saint-Lambert-de-Lauzon, Beauceville, Saint-Joseph-de-Beauce and Saint-Isidore.

It was created along with Beauce-Sud for the 1973 election from parts of Beauce. It also took parts from Dorchester and Lévis electoral districts.

In the change from the 2001 to the 2011 electoral map, its territory was unchanged.

Members of the National Assembly

Election results

|}

|}

^ Change is from redistributed results. CAQ change is from ADQ.

|-

|Liberal
|Richard Lehoux
|align="right"|9,612
|align="right"|37.98
|align="right"|

|-

|-

|Independent
|Benoît Roy
|align="right"|117
|align="right"|0.46
|align="right"|
|}

|-

|Liberal
|Claude Drouin
|align="right"|8,056
|align="right"|26.38
|align="right"|

|-

|-

|Independent
|Benoît Roy
|align="right"|83
|align="right"|0.27
|align="right"|
|}

|-

|Liberal
|Normand Poulin
|align="right"|11,104
|align="right"|38.37
|align="right"|

|-

|-

|}

References

External links
Information
 Elections Quebec

Election results
 Election results (National Assembly)

Maps
 2011 map (PDF)
 2001 map (Flash)
2001–2011 changes (Flash)
1992–2001 changes (Flash)
 Electoral map of Chaudière-Appalaches region
 Quebec electoral map, 2011

Quebec provincial electoral districts
Sainte-Marie, Quebec